Valiant (YT‑802) is a United States Navy .

Construction and commissioning
The contract for Valiant was awarded 10 September 2007. She was laid down by J.M. Martinac Shipbuilding Corp., Tacoma, Washington and launched 25 July 2009. Valiant was delivered to the Navy 21 January 2010.

Operational history

Valiant is assigned to the Navy Region Northwest.

References

 
 

 

Valiant-class tugboats
Ships built in Tacoma, Washington
2009 ships